is a 2015 Japanese horror film directed by Hideo Nakata and a remake of Don't Look Up (1996). It was released on November 21, 2015.

In May 2018, an anthology series based on the film was released in the United States on Toku.

Synopsis
Sara (Haruka Shimazaki) is a young actress who gained her a small role in a stage play directed by Gota Nishikino (Mantaro Koichi). Sara is admires by the leading actresses Aoi (Riho Takada) and Kaori (Rika Adachi), who are practicing hard every day. But then, a female staff member is found dead in the theater. While the police are investigating the situation, Aoi falls down from a balcony and loses consciousness. Due to her injuries she won't be able to play the leading role, Gota gives the part to Sara to takeover her lead role. But Sara has got to learn very soon that having the leading role is not to her advantage as she learns that somebody or something is trying to end the production at all cost, which puts Sara in deadly danger.

Cast
Haruka Shimazaki as Sara
Mantaro Koichi as Gota Nishikino
Rika Adachi as Kaori
Riho Takada as Aoi
Keita Machida as Izumi
Ikuji Nakamura

Release
The film was part of the Midnight Passion section of the 20th Busan International Film Festival.

Reception

Box office
The film grossed  on its opening weekend in Japan.

Critical response
Maggie Lee of Variety responded negatively to the film, stating that "Hideo Nakata sinks to new lows with this creaky and vacuous backstage thriller."

References

External links
 

2015 films
2015 horror films
Films about theatre
Films directed by Hideo Nakata
Films scored by Kenji Kawai
Films set in a theatre
Remakes of Japanese films
Japanese horror films
Shochiku films
2010s Japanese films
2010s Japanese-language films